Marshall "Marty" Wilde (born 1974) is an American politician from Oregon. A Democrat, he served in the Oregon House of Representatives where he represented District 11.  This district included all or parts of Eugene, Creswell, Brownsville, rural Lane County, and rural Linn County. Wilde was first elected in 2018.

Wilde retired from the legislature in 2022 to make an unsuccessful run for Circuit Court judge.

Early life and career
Wilde was raised on a small farm in Blachly, Oregon. His father was an organic farmer and his mother was an educator. He credits community investment in Medicaid, food stamps, and public schools for helping his family escape the cycle of poverty.

After graduating from the University of Maryland, Wilde joined the Oregon Army National Guard and later the Air National Guard. He has spent more than 27 years as an active member of the US military. During his military career, he served as Chief, Rule of Law in Afghanistan, for which he was awarded a Bronze Star. In addition, he was deployed in support of peace operations in Bosnia, served in Qatar prosecuting cases of Sexual assault in the United States military, and served in the NORAD Air Operations Center. He fought forest fires in Oregon, and worked on the conversion of a coal plant at the Elmendorf Air Force Base in Fairbanks, Alaska to less-polluting natural gas.

While serving in the military, Wilde attended the University of Oregon School of Law and earned a Master of Laws in health law at the University of Houston, and a Master of Healthcare Administration from the University of Maryland.

From 2007 to 2010, Wilde was the deputy district attorney for Linn County. Prior to his election, Wilde served as the Executive Director of the Lane County Medical Society where he worked to help improve access to care for patients on the Oregon Health Plan.

Political career
In January 2018, Wilde filed his candidacy for the Oregon House of Representatives seat representing District 11 to replace incumbent Representative Phil Barnhart, who chose to retire after serving in the role for 17 years. In the election the following year, he defeated Kimberly Koops in the Democratic primary and later defeated Republican Mark Herbert in the general election, securing 57% of the vote. Wilde attributed his long career of public service as a deciding factor in the race.

Wilde's legislative goals include advocating for public schools, a clean environment, a fair tax system, education, healthcare, and housing. Believing healthcare to be a universal right, he supports universal coverage and expansion of the Oregon Health Plan. He plans to work across party lines with House Republicans to see how the business community could work with tax reform and to ensure that the Oregon tax rate is competitive nationwide to attract and keep businesses from moving or going out of business.

Since his election, Wilde has served on the Advisory Commission On Transparency, the House Committees on Energy and the Environment, and the Committee on Veterans and Emergency Preparedness.

Personal life
Wilde lives in Eugene with his wife Monique, daughter Bella, and son Griffin.

References

External links
 Campaign website
 Legislative website

Democratic Party members of the Oregon House of Representatives
Living people
21st-century American politicians
University System of Maryland alumni
University of Houston alumni
1974 births
People from Lane County, Oregon
Politicians from Eugene, Oregon
Oregon lawyers
21st-century American lawyers